Gary Vivian Steyn (born 10 March 1961) is a former Zimbabwean cricketer. Born in Umtali (now Mutare), Manicaland, he played one first-class match for Mashonaland Country Districts during the 1994–95 Logan Cup.

References

External links
 
 

1961 births
Living people
Cricketers from Mutare
Mashonaland cricketers
Zimbabwean cricketers